The Mount Olive African Methodist Episcopal Church (also known as the Hope Henry AME Church) is a historic church in Clearwater, Pinellas County, Florida.

It is located at 600 Jones Street.

On February 3, 2000, it was added to the U.S. National Register of Historic Places.

See also
African Methodist Episcopal Church

References

External links
 Pinellas County listings at National Register of Historic Places
 Mount Olive African Methodist Episcopalian Church at Florida's Office of Cultural and Historical Programs

African Methodist Episcopal churches in Florida
Buildings and structures in Clearwater, Florida
Churches in Pinellas County, Florida
Churches on the National Register of Historic Places in Florida
National Register of Historic Places in Pinellas County, Florida